Adil Atan (Abkhaz: name Twanba, 1 January 1929 – 18 April 1989) was a Turkish wrestler. He was born in Adapazarı in the Sakarya Province. He was Olympic bronze medalist in Freestyle wrestling in 1952, and also competed at the 1956 Olympics.

References

External links
 

1929 births
1989 deaths
Turkish people of Abkhazian descent
Sportspeople from Adapazarı
Olympic wrestlers of Turkey
Wrestlers at the 1952 Summer Olympics
Wrestlers at the 1956 Summer Olympics
Turkish male sport wrestlers
Olympic bronze medalists for Turkey
Olympic medalists in wrestling
Medalists at the 1952 Summer Olympics
Road incident deaths in Turkey
20th-century Turkish people